Jesse Robert Turi Mulligan is a New Zealand television and radio broadcaster. He currently works as a co-host for The Project on Three, an afternoon presenter on RNZ National, and a writer for The New Zealand Herald's Viva Magazine.

Career 
Mulligan began his television career as a writer and then regular panellist on Three's comedy gameshow 7 Days. In 2013, he started as one of the three hosts on TVNZ 1's new current affairs show, Seven Sharp. He left the show on 17 April 2014, after his co-hosts Ali Mau and Greg Boyed left at the end of 2013 and were replaced by Toni Street and Mike Hosking, as part of refreshing the show. In 2014 and 2015, he hosted comedy show Best Bits.

In 2017, he started hosting Three's new current affairs show, The Project.

As part of his program Afternoons with Jesse Mulligan with RNZ National, he presents the weekly radio show Critter of the Week with the Department of Conservation threatened species ambassador Nicola Toki.

Personal life 
Mulligan is the son of Nick Mulligan, who was the Values Party candidate in Hamilton East at the 1975 general election. Jesse Mulligan is married to psychologist Victoria Dawson-Wheeler and has four children.

See also 
 List of New Zealand television personalities

References 

New Zealand television presenters
New Zealand radio presenters
New Zealand food writers
People from Hamilton, New Zealand
New Zealand male comedians
Year of birth missing (living people)
Living people